Robert S. Hogg  is an HIV researcher focused on improving outcomes for people living with HIV/AIDS through the understanding of barriers to accessing HIV testing, treatment and care in Canada and globally. He is a senior research scientist and the former Director of the HIV/AIDS Drug Treatment Program at the B.C. Centre for Excellence in HIV/AIDS. He is a Simon Fraser University Distinguished Professor (the first to receive the title) and the Associate Dean of Research of the faculty of Health Sciences. He is a prolific and highly cited author with an H-index of 111 and over 1000 peer-reviewed papers. He is both a Member of the Order of Canada and a Fellow of the Canadian Academy of Health Sciences.

Access to Care 
Dr. Hogg's research has extensively covered access and barriers to care such as his 1998 senior author paper looking at barriers to the use of free antiretroviral therapy in injection drug users.

Antiretroviral Therapy 
Hogg has published extensively on antiretroviral therapy from their inception to current times such as looking at antiretrovirals' effect on mortality.

Drug resistance 
Hogg's 2006 paper demonstrated that resistance to NNRTIs resulted in greater mortality than the development of resistance to protease inhibitors.

Treatment as prevention strategy 

Hogg, Julio Montaner and others are original authors of the Treatment as prevention strategy (TasP). The Treatment as Prevention strategy is based on the premise that administering highly active antiretroviral therapy to all medically eligible HIV-positive individuals will decrease transmission rates.

References 

Living people
Members of the Order of Canada
Fellows of the Royal Society of Canada
HIV/AIDS researchers
Year of birth missing (living people)